Desulfovibrio oxyclinae is a bacterium. It is sulfate-reducing, and was first isolated from the upper 3mm layer of a hypersaline cyanobacterial mat in Sinai.

References

Further reading
Staley, James T., et al. "Bergey's manual of systematic bacteriology, vol. 3. "Williams and Wilkins, Baltimore, MD (2012).
Sigalevich, Pavel, and Yehuda Cohen. "Oxygen-Dependent Growth of the Sulfate-Reducing Bacterium Desulfovibrio oxyclinae in Coculture withMarinobacter sp. Strain MB in an Aerated Sulfate-Depleted Chemostat."Applied and Environmental Microbiology 66.11 (2000): 5019–5023.

External links 
LPSN

Type strain of Desulfovibrio oxyclinae at BacDive -  the Bacterial Diversity Metadatabase

Bacteria described in 1997
Desulfovibrio